James Raine (1830–1896) was a British antiquarian and ecclesiast. He was a Canon and Chancellor of York Minster.

Biography

Early life and education
Raine was born in Durham, England, and was the son of James Raine and Margaret Peacock. He lived with his parents and three sisters (including Margaret Raine Hunt) in Crook Hall, Durham. He was educated at the Cathedral School in Durham and the University of Durham, from which he graduated in 1851.

Clergyman
From 1857 to 1868 he was the vicar of St Lawrence's Church, York. He left this role to be the Rector of both St Michael's Church, Spurriergate and St Crux, Pavement, retiring from the former in 1885 and retaining the latter until his death. He was appointed Canon of York Minster in 1866 and Chancellor in 1891.

A stained glass window in All Saints' Church, Pavement is dedicated to Raine. It depicts Saints Aidan of Lindisfarne, Paulinus (first Bishop of York) and Cuthbert (holding St Oswald's head).

Antiquarian
Raine was an Honorary Curator of Antiquities at the Yorkshire Philosophical Society (who operated the Yorkshire Museum) from 1873, and was appointed a Vice-President of the society in 1876. At the time of his death in 1896 he was also a Trustee of the museum. He donated several objects to the Yorkshire Museum throughout his life. Raine served as the honorary librarian of York Minster. He was the secretary of the Surtees Society from 1855 to 1895. His father had also served in this role from 1834–1849.

He was awarded an honorary Doctor of Civil Law from Durham University in 1882 in recognition of his archaeological work.

Family
Raine was married to Annie Keyworth.  Together they had nine children. Their son Angelo also served as Rector of St Crux from 1937–1956. A portrait of James Raine was produced by another son, Henry Keyworth Raine in 1906 for the Yorkshire Museum. It was transferred to the York Art Gallery in 1971.

Select publications
Raine, J. 1875. " An account of several Roman inscriptions discovered during the Railway Excavations", Annual Report of the Yorkshire Philosophical Society for 1875. 1–5.
Raine, J. 1880. "Curious discovery made in the garden of St. Mary's Convent, near Micklegate Bar", Annual Report of the Yorkshire Philosophical Society for 1880. 48.
Raine, J. 1893. Historic Towns: York. 
Raine, J. 1884. "Recent discoveries of Roman remains at York", The Academy (7 July 1884), 35.

References

External links
Correspondence and papers relating to the Rev. Canon James Raine in the Borthwick Institute for Archives.

1830 births
1896 deaths
English antiquarians
People educated at Durham School
Clergy from Yorkshire
People from Durham, England
Members of the Yorkshire Philosophical Society
Yorkshire Museum people
Alumni of University College, Durham
Surtees Society